Malthe Jakobsen (born 29 October 2003) is a Danish racing driver. He is the reigning champion of the European Le Mans Series in the LMP3 class with Cool Racing.

Single-seater career

2018 
Jakobsen began his car racing career in his homeland, competing for FSP in the 2018 F4 Danish Championship. Having initially struggled in the first half of the year, the Dane scored three category podiums and a pole position in the final third of the campaign, thus finishing sixth in the standings.

Near the end of the year, Jakobsen also made two cameo appearances in the F4 South East Asia Championship, where he took his first win in single-seater motorsport at Sepang.

2019 
The following season, Jakobsen remained with FSP in Danish F4. After missing the season opener, a triple of podiums at Jyllandsringen, which included a win in Race 3, commenced Jakobsen's title campaign. A pair of victories at Djursland and Kinnekulle followed respectively, before the Dane took a hattrick of victories at Padborg Park. Three more wins followed, as Jakobsen locked out the championship in dominating fashion in the season finale, finishing 78 points ahead of his nearest challenger, Jonas Lindhard Nielsen. At the end of the campaign, Jakobsen represented Denmark at the inaugural FIA Motorsport Games Formula 4 Cup.

Endurance career

2020 
For 2020, Jakobsen switched to prototype racing, competing in the LMP3 category of the European Le Mans Series for RLR MSport alongside James Dayson. He finished his rookie campaign, during which he was described as having shown "maturity beyond his years", tenth in the standings, with a sole podium coming at the season opener in Le Castellet.

2021 
Jakobsen stayed with RLR for another year in the ELMS, this time partnering Mike Benham and Alex Kapadia. His team once again started their campaign out with a podium, a second place in Barcelona, but failed to finish three of the remaining five races, thus dropping to ninth by season's end.

2022 
Going into his third season of the European Le Mans Series, Jakobsen made the move to Cool Racing. Commencing the season at Paul Ricard, Jakobsen started out in strong fashion, taking pole position and helping his team to win the four hour-long race. Another pole position came at the next round in Imola, which would eventually result in a podium finish. The following event, held in Monza, would bear less fruit however, as the team was forced to retire from the race. Following another third place in Barcelona, where Jakobsen scored his fourth pole in four races, a collision by the Dane's teammate Maurice Smith meant the end of the race in Spa-Francorchamps, which made the team's title aspirations seem unlikely going into the season finale at Portimão. In spite of the uphill task, Jakobsen managed to take pole position once more, making him the season's only LMP3 polesitter, and ended up winning the race. With title rivals Inter Europol Competition retiring late in the race following a car failure with a subsequent collision, Jakobsen, Smith and Mike Benham were crowned champions of the ELMS' LMP3 category.

As a result of his championship victory, Jakobsen was invited to test the Peugeot 9X8 Hypercar during the FIA World Endurance Championship rookie test in November 2022.

2023 
Progression to the LMP2 class was in order for the 2023 season, as Jakobsen remained with Cool Racing in the ELMS. Before embarking on his European season however, the Dane teamed up with Nicolas Lapierre and amateur Alexandre Coigny in the Asian Le Mans Series. Despite Jakobsen setting the fastest lap in the second race at Dubai, the team experienced a difficult opening event, as Coigny collided with a GT car in Race 1 and the outfit finished fifth on Sunday. For the event at the Yas Marina Circuit, Lapierre would step away from driving duties in order to give Jakobsen more seat time during the races, which ended up paying off immediately, the Dane taking a commanding victory on Saturday. On Sunday, a drive-through penalty due to an infringement regarding minimum pit stop time would end the outfit's chances of obtaining victory, as Jakobsen and Coigny finished third, which earned them the runner-up spot in the championship.

Racing record

Racing career summary 

† As Jakobsen was a guest driver, he was ineligible to score points.* Season still in progress.

Complete F4 Danish Championship results 
(key) (Races in bold indicate pole position) (Races in italics indicate fastest lap)

Complete European Le Mans Series results 
(key) (Races in bold indicate pole position; results in italics indicate fastest lap)

WeatherTech SportsCar Championship results
(key)(Races in bold indicate pole position, Results are overall/class)

References

External links 

 

2003 births
Living people
Danish racing drivers
European Le Mans Series drivers
Asian Le Mans Series drivers
FIA Motorsport Games drivers
WeatherTech SportsCar Championship drivers
Team Meritus drivers
Danish F4 Championship drivers
Le Mans Cup drivers